Best Time Ever with Neil Patrick Harris (or Best Time Ever) is an American live television variety series adaptation of the British variety series Ant & Dec's Saturday Night Takeaway. The one-hour show is hosted and executive-produced by Neil Patrick Harris featuring Nicole Scherzinger as a co-host. The series aired on NBC from September 15, to November 3, 2015. On December 15, 2015, it was announced that the show had been cancelled after one season.

Production 
The plan to bring the series to television was announced on October 27, 2014, and was followed by a teaser promo during the 2015 Super Bowl. On May 10, 2015, NBC officially added the program to its lineup. The show was broadcast from Studio K of Kaufman Astoria Studios in New York. It was later announced in early September that Nicole Scherzinger would be joining the team.

Episodes

Episode format

Opening

Episodes 1-5
As the show's main intro plays, the episode's guest announcer reviews what will happen in this week's episode. After the intro finishes, the camera focuses on the guest announcer, who introduces themselves and usually gives a little information about themselves. Then, the announcer introduces Neil as he goes through a sign titled "Best Suit Ever", which dresses him up in his suit, before coming out. Neil then has a brief talk, which includes re-introducing himself, re-introducing the announcer, and information about the current week's happenings.

Episodes 6-8
The intro stopped playing at the beginning of each episode after episode 5, and the opening now just begins with the guest announcer welcoming the audience, then plays scenes of what will happen in the episode as the announcer reviews the events. After the scenes, the camera returns to the announcer as they introduce themselves, and then introduce Neil as he goes through the "Best Suit Ever" sign before coming out and having the brief talk.

Audience Surprise
Following the brief talk, Neil will surprise an audience member. This segment has received many different names but typically revolves around a close friend or relative sending in personal information to the producers and participating in parodies of popular media. In the end, Neil awards the audience member with a trip or prize.
 Best Days Of Your Life - Episode 1
 Get Ready - Episode 2
 We Are Family - Episode 3
 The Real Housewives Of Richmond, Virginia, Reunion Special - Episode 4
 My Diary... - Episode 5
 The Tweet Is On/It's Neil's Mom - Episode 6
 Somebody's Watching Me - Episode 7
 Best Time Ever Awards - Episode 8

Get Lucky
Get Lucky is a trivia gameshow in which one audience member is asked a series of 50-50 trivia questions from the current week's events. With every correct answer in 60 seconds, the player chooses a number which corresponds with a variety of prizes. Prizes range from novelty items such as candy all the way to a car or Jeep. At the end, the player is given a choice to keep the prizes already won or answer a final "Make or Break" question for a chance to win all 16 prizes or walk away with nothing.

Undercover
Undercover is a pre-taped prank segment in which Neil pranks a celebrity. In some instances, the celebrities are interviewed by Neil live.

Sing Along Live
Sing Along Live is a live karaoke segment where a popular singer or group sing a karaoke-style version of one of their most well-known songs. Three viewers are Skyped in via a hidden camera as the guest singer performs. At certain points, the song stops and one of the viewers must fill in a missing lyric, similar to that of Don't Forget the Lyrics! and The Singing Bee. If they sing the right lyric, they receive $1,000.

Notes
1. In the 6th episode, an audience member took part of the segment instead of a Skyped viewer.
2. In the 7th episode, the viewers had to fill three missing lyrics instead of one.
3. In the 8th episode, due to a poor Skype connection, one viewer did not sing the song (which was I Want It That Way by The Backstreet Boys in particular). However, he was still given $1,000.

Voices in Your Head
Voices in Your Head is another pre-taped prank segment. Neil, who is joined by a celebrity, will communicate with another celebrity, giving him/her instructions on how to handle three people.

Ticket to Slide
Ticket to Slide is a live segment. The contestants are regular people who don't know that they get to take part in a 60 ft slide, covered in oil and water, to grab keys. The contestants with keys unlock suitcases containing fantastic prizes, such as trip to Australia.

Neil Vs.
In Neil Vs., Neil takes on another celebrity in a head-to-head physical or mental challenge. Past challenges have included trivia competitions and zipline races.

End of the Show Show
The End of the Show Show is a finale spectacular in which Neil, Nicole, Little NPH, Little Nicole and the guest announcer join a popular performance group for a finale show.

References

External links 
 Official Website
 
 

2010s American variety television series
2015 American television series debuts
2015 American television series endings
American television series based on British television series
English-language television shows
NBC original programming
Television series by ITV Studios